Miss Ecuador 2020 was the 70th edition of the Miss Ecuador pageant. The contest was held on 17 October, 2020 at Hotel Wyndham Sail in Manta, Manabí Province. Cristina Hidalgo from Guayas Province crowned Leyla Espinoza from Los Ríos Province as her successor at the end of the event. The winner would compete at Miss Universe 2020.

Results

Final results

§ - Voted in the Top 7 by the public

Special awards

National costume contest

Contestants
The delegates were as follows:

Notes

Debuts

Returns
Last compete in 1999

Last compete in 2017

Last compete in 2018

Withdrawals

 Santa Elena

Did not compete
 - Tatiana Alexandra Guillén Jaramillo
 - Judith Isabella San Lucas Aguilar

Crossover
Betsabeth Paladines was Reina de Esmeraldas 2018.
María José competed at Miss World Ecuador 2019, but she unplaced.
Keidy Boza was Reina de Balzar 2019 and competed at Reina del Guayas 2019 where she unplaced.
Saskya Sacasa was Reina de Quevedo 2016.
Milena Gusmán was Reina de Ibarra 2018.
Nicole Loor was Reina Mundial del Banano Ecuador 2014 and competed at Reina Mundial del Banano 2014 finishing as 3rd Runner-up (5th place). Also, she was Reina de Manta 2014 and Reina de Manabí 2016.
Valentina Mendoza was Reina de Portoviejo 2016 and 1st Runner-up (3rd place) at Reina de Manabí 2016.
Andrea Quito was Reina de Macas 2017 and Virreina de Morona Santiago 2017. Also, she competed at Miss World Ecuador 2019 where she finished at 1st Runner-up.
Celeste Lozada was Reina de Archidona 2018 and Reina de Napo 2019.
Dayar Olmedo was Reina de Santo Domingo 2015.

References

External links
Official Miss Ecuador website

2020 beauty pageants
Beauty pageants in Ecuador
Miss Ecuador